Pieter Anton Tiele (18 January 1834, Leiden22 January 1889, Utrecht) was for many years the librarian of Utrecht University.

Life
He was distinguished himself by his bibliographical studies, more especially by his several works on the history of colonization in Asia.

Among these the most noteworthy are: De Opkomst van het nederlandsch Gezag in Oost-Indie (1886); De Vestiging der Portugeezen, in Indie (1873), and other books on the early Portuguese colonization in Maritime Southeast Asia.

Family
Cornelis Petrus Tiele was his brother.

References

Attribution:

External links

1834 births
1889 deaths
19th-century Dutch historians
People from Leiden